The Carter constant is a conserved quantity for motion around black holes in the general relativistic formulation of gravity.  Its SI base units are kg2⋅m4⋅s−2. Carter's constant was derived for a spinning, charged black hole  by Australian theoretical physicist Brandon Carter in 1968.  Carter's constant along with the energy, axial angular momentum, and particle rest mass provide the four conserved quantities necessary to uniquely determine all orbits in the Kerr–Newman spacetime (even those of charged particles).

Formulation

Carter noticed that the Hamiltonian for motion in Kerr spacetime was separable in Boyer–Lindquist coordinates, allowing the constants of such motion to be easily identified using Hamilton–Jacobi theory.  The Carter constant can be written as follows:

,

This results in some confusion as to the form of Carter's constant. For example it is sometimes more convenient to use:

The quantity  is useful because it is always non-negative. In general any fourth conserved quantity for motion in the Kerr family of spacetimes may be referred to as "Carter's constant".

As generated by a Killing tensor 

Noether's theorem states that each conserved quantity of a system are generates a continuous symmetry of that system. Carter's constant is related to a higher order symmetry of the Kerr metric generated by a second order Killing tensor field  (different  than used above).  In component form:

,

where  is the four-velocity of the particle in motion.  The components of the Killing tensor in Boyer–Lindquist coordinates are:

,

with

 .

Schwarzschild limit 

The spherical symmetry of the Schwarzschild metric for non-spinning black holes allows one to reduce the problem of finding the trajectories of particles to three dimensions. Carter's constant for Schwarzschild space is:

.

By a rotation of coordinates we can put any orbit in the  plane so .  In this case , the square of the orbital angular momentum.

See also

 Kerr metric
 Kerr–Newman metric
 Boyer–Lindquist coordinates
 Hamilton–Jacobi equation
 Euler's three-body problem

References

Black holes
Conservation laws